Wheatfield Township may refer to the following places:

 Wheatfield Township, Clinton County, Illinois
 Wheatfield Township, Jasper County, Indiana
 Wheatfield Township, Ingham County, Michigan
 Wheatfield Township, Grand Forks County, North Dakota
 Wheatfield Township, Perry County, Pennsylvania

There is also:
 East Wheatfield Township, Indiana County, Pennsylvania
 West Wheatfield Township, Indiana County, Pennsylvania

See also

Wheatfield (disambiguation)

Township name disambiguation pages